Callabiana is a comune (municipality) in the Province of Biella in the Italian region Piedmont, located about  northeast of Turin and about  northwest of Biella.

Callabiana borders the following municipalities: Andorno Micca, Bioglio, Camandona, Gaby, Pettinengo, Piatto, Piedicavallo, Tavigliano, Vallanzengo.

Callabiana is on the slopes of Monte Casto. The whole territory is divided into 15 hamlets: Trabbia, Lucca, Virla, Socco, Steglio, Cordaro, Nelva, Corte, Fusero, Chiesa, Pianezze, Cascina Nuova, Vacchione, Pettani and Ribatto. The most important one is Pianezze, which has an important textile factory, called Carlo Barbera, where luxury clothes sold all over the world are made. Callabiana is also known for its dam where many people from all the district of Biella go fishing and relaxing. Quite all the territory of the district is covered by woods, inhabited by foxes, wild boars, squirrels and many kind of birds. In autumn mushrooms and chestnuts are searched in these woods. Gibello, Nelva, Vercellotti and Trabbia, are typical surnames of Callabiana and almost all the population has one of them. The most important building is the church, built in the 16th century, where the parish priest of Camandona, a neighbouring village, has been celebrating mass every Sunday since the death of Armando Strona, the last priest of Callabiana. The village festival is on 15 August, and so during all that month there are celebrations at the Pro Loco, that reach their climax with the big lunch on the 15th, a not to be missed appointment for everyone in the village. In summer many emigrants come back to their houses, and so you can meet someone from France, mostly Savoie, Belgium and Germany. Almost everybody in the village has some relatives abroad, because in the first part of the 1900, many people left Callabiana to look for work abroad.

Demographic evolution

References

Photo gallery 

Cities and towns in Piedmont